Harttia rhombocephala is a species of armored catfish endemic to Brazil where it is found in the Farias River basin.

References
 

rhombocephala
Fish of South America
Fish of Brazil
Endemic fauna of Brazil
Taxa named by Paulo de Miranda-Ribeiro
Fish described in 1939